Sadabad (also Romanized as Saʿdābād) is a village in Kuhestan Rural District, in the Central District of Nain County, Isfahan Province, Iran. At the 2006 census, its population was 6, in 4 families.

References 

Populated places in Nain County